The Lower Periyar Dam (Pambla Dam) is a dam built on the Periyar River as part of the Lower Periyar Hydroelectric Project in Kanjikuzhi Panchayat, Idukki District, Kerala. The dam was built to generate electricity. The lower Periyar dam is at Pambla, five kilometres downstream from where Muthirapuzha merges with main river. This 32.36-metre-high dam made of concrete has a width of 284 meters. The powerhouse is at Karimanal, near Neriamangalam, where three generators  are installed with a power production capacity of 60 MW each, or a cumulative 180 MW. The Dam was completed in the year 1998  Taluks through which release flow are Idukki, Kothamangalam, Muvattupuzha, Kunnathunadu, Aluva, Kodungalloor and Paravur.

Specifications
Latitude : 9⁰ 57′ 44 " N
Longitude: 76⁰ 57′ 24" E
Panchayath: Kanjikuzhi
 Village : Kanjikuzhi
District : Idukki
River Basin : Periyar
River: Periyar
Release from Dam to river : Periyar
Purpose of Project : Hydro Power
Year of completion : 1998
Type of Dam : Concrete – gravity
Classification : HH ( High Height)
Height from deepest foundation : 32.36 m
Length : 284.00 m
Maximum Water Level (MWL) : 256.00 m
Full Reservoir Level ( FRL) : 253.00 m
Storage at FRL : 5.30 Mm3
Spillway : Ogee type- 5 Nos. radial gates, each of size 13.5 x 15.65 m

Electricity generation
The Lower Periyar Powerhouse in Karimanal  generates electricity from the dam's water. The maximum storage capacity of the dam is 253 feet. The water level in the dam is reported to the powerhouse at Karimanal every half an hour. The Hydroelectric Project was launched on 27 September 1997, to generate 180 MW of electricity using 3 turbines with a capacity of 60 MW. Kerala State Electricity Board is overseeing the dam.

References

Periyar (river)
Dams in Kerala